The Luanda Agreement is a 2002 ceasefire and normalization of relations between the government of Uganda and the Democratic Republic of the Congo (DRC), signed in Luanda, Angola. It sought to end the ongoing Second Congo War and had far-reaching implications for regional peace. The Luanda Agreement became a baseline for peace accords in Africa and is viewed favorably by outside entities, such as the United Nations and the European Union.

History 
The agreement was signed in 2002 between the governments of Uganda and the DRC. It established a ceasefire and normalized relations between the two countries. Prior to this agreement, the two countries experienced prolonged periods of armed conflict. While this agreement sought to rebuild regional stability, it is questionable as to whether lasting peace/reconstruction followed.

The conflict in the Congo has been called the "center of Africa's world war". While DRC gained independence in the 1960s, it was accompanied by civil war. The initial conflict was brief, but a longer and bloodier struggle followed. In 1997, the First Congo War began, followed by the Second Congo War in 1998. Several other African countries became involved.

Relations between Uganda and the DRC 
The relationship between Uganda and the DRC was plagued by violence for decades. Uganda has been plundering the DRC of valuable minerals since the 1990s. The relationship is complicated by the ADF, a rebel group that attacked Western Uganda from the early 1990s well into the 2000s. Uganda President Yoweri Museveni blamed the DRC and the UN for the group's continued existence.

International Court of Justice 
The Lusaka Ceasefire Agreement was a peace treaty to end the Second Congo War. All military operations were to halt and actions were to be taken to show respect for human rights and reconcile the relations among Angola, DRC, Namibia, Rwanda, Uganda, Zambia and Zimbabwe) in 1999. The International Court of Justice deemed this agreement a modus operandi rather than a legally binding agreement. The ICJ's treatment of the agreement is thought to have broader implications, because "the ICJ's authority in the interpretation of international law is likely to influence the perception of the parties to armed conflicts with regard to legal nature and effects of peace agreements...it threatens to undermine the crucial role of peace agreements in the resolution of armed conflicts." The interpretation of the Lusaka agreement thereby set a precedent that undermined the legal authority of the Luanda Agreement.

The Luanda Agreement is a bilateral agreement that directly alters the terms of the Lusaka Agreement. However, both agreements call for the explicit consent of the DRC to allow Ugandan troops on their land. This then led to multiple disputes within the ICJ between Uganda and the DRC. In 1999, the DRC filed three claims asserting that Uganda violated international laws:

Uganda filed three counter claims: (1) the DRC used force against Uganda, (2) the DRC allowed attacks on Ugandan diplomatic premises and personnel in Kinshasa in violation of the law of diplomatic protection and (3) the DRC violated the 1999 Lusaka Agreement.

The court ruled that Uganda had violated DRC's territorial integrity and that Uganda was an occupying power, but granted Uganda's argument that the DRC had violated Ugandan diplomatic protection.

Reaction 
The European Union issued a statement applauding the Luanda Agreement as a mechanism to aid peace efforts. However, the EU also recognized that the continued fighting among the Congolese people as a reason for Uganda to continue to protect people through its presence.

References 

Democratic Republic of the Congo–Uganda relations
2002 treaties
History of Luanda